The following are the records of Qatar in Olympic weightlifting. Records are maintained in each weight class for the snatch lift, clean and jerk lift, and the total for both lifts by the Qatar Weightlifting and Bodybuilding Federation.

Men

Women

References

records
Qatar
Olympic weightlifting
weightlifting